JadeWeser Airport  is a minor unscheduled airport near Wilhelmshaven, Lower Saxony, Germany. It is located near JadeWeserPort, a major German deep-sea harbour construction site.

Airlines and destinations
Since August 2018, there are no regular scheduled passenger flights.

See also
 Transport in Germany
 List of airports in Germany

References

External links

 Official website

Buildings and structures in Lower Saxony
Wilhelmshaven